Adam Franciszek Ksawery Rostkowski (26 May 1660 – 5 March 1738) was a Roman Catholic prelate who served as Auxiliary Bishop of Lutsk (1700–1738), and a Polish writer and translator.

Biography
Adam Franciszek Ksawery Rostkowski was born in Jeduabrun on 26 May 1660. He hailed from the Rostkowski noble family of Dąbrowa coat of arms. He attended Jesuit colleges in Łomża, Grodno and Warsaw. He was ordained a priest on 27 May 1684. Afterwards he studied in Rome and Ingolstadt. In 1692, he obtained a PhD in theology at the Sapienza University of Rome, and then he returned to Poland.

In 1695 he was a deputy to the Polish Crown Tribunal. On 10 May 1700, he was appointed during the papacy of Pope Innocent XII as Auxiliary Bishop of Łuck (Lutsk) and Titular Bishop of Philadelphia in Arabia. He wrote historical and legal books, brochures and translated French literature into Polish. In the 1733 Polish–Lithuanian royal election he supported Stanisław Leszczyński. He served as Auxiliary Bishop of Łuck until his death in Tarczyn on 5 March 1738.

Episcopal succession

References

External links and additional sources
 (for Chronology of Bishops) 
 (for Chronology of Bishops)  

17th-century Roman Catholic bishops in the Polish–Lithuanian Commonwealth
17th-century Polish people
18th-century Polish–Lithuanian writers
Bishops appointed by Pope Innocent XII
People from Masovian Voivodeship (1526–1795)
Polish translators
Sapienza University of Rome alumni
1660 births
1738 deaths